Ruomu was a figure in Chinese mythology.

In the Records of the Grand Historian, Sima Qian's account of the origins of the House of Ying makes him the son of Fei the Great and the brother of Lian the Great. His mother was said to be a 'jade lady of the Yao. Ruomu was the great-great-grandfather of Feichang.

Characters in Chinese mythology
Xia dynasty people